Tokyo Daijingu is a shrine located in Tokyo.  The shrine is also called O-Ise-sama in Tokyo because of the deities enshrined there. It is one of the top five shrines in Tokyo.

History 
The shrine was built in the early Meiji period by Jingu-kyo so people in Tokyo could worship the deities enshrined at Grand Shrine of Ise from afar. Back then it was originally called Hibiya Daijingu.

In 1901, a wedding took place at the shrine, being the first Shinto wedding held in an urban area.

After the Kanto Earthquake, the shrine was moved to Iidabashi in 1928 and renamed to Iidabashi Daijingu. Then after World War 2, the place changed its name to Tokyo Daijingu.
Beppyo shrines

Enshrined kami 
Deities enshrined here include.

 Amaterasu

 Toyouke-no-Ohkami

 Ameno-Minakanushi

 Takamimusubi

 Kamimusubi

 Yamatohime-no-mikoto

References 

Shinto shrines in Tokyo